Dangerous Holiday is a 1937 American drama film written and directed by Nicholas T. Barrows. The film stars Ronald Sinclair, Guinn "Big Boy" Williams, Hedda Hopper, Jack La Rue, Jed Prouty and Lynne Roberts. The film was released on June 7, 1937, by Republic Pictures.

Plot
Violin prodigy Ronnie Kimball is tired of being exploited by his manager and family, so he decides to disappear for a some time.

Cast
Ronald Sinclair as Ronnie Kimball 
Guinn "Big Boy" Williams as Duke Edwards
Hedda Hopper as Lottie Courtney
Jack La Rue as Gollenger
Jed Prouty as Gifford
Lynne Roberts as Jean Robbins 
William Bakewell as Tom Wilson
Fern Emmett as Aunt Elsie
Virginia Sale as Aunt Augusta
Franklin Pangborn as Doffle
Grady Sutton as Max
William Newell as Solitaire
Thomas E. Jackson as Marty
Olaf Hytten as Popcorn
Jack Mulhall as Police Sergeant
Michael Jeffrey as Jerry Courtney
Harvey Clark as Benjamin Robbins
Wade Boteler as Police Captain Blake 
Carleton Young as Tango

References

External links
 

1937 films
1930s English-language films
American drama films
1937 drama films
Republic Pictures films
American black-and-white films
1930s American films